Let It Go is the fourth studio album by English singer Will Young. It was released on 27 September 2008. It is Will Young's first album in 3 years, since the release of Keep On in late 2005. The album has now sold over 400,000 copies certified platinum.

The first single released from the album was "Changes", which was released on 15 September 2008 in the UK, and peaked at number 10 on the UK Singles Chart. The second single lifted was "Grace", and despite heavy airplay on music stations and TV music channels, the single only managed to peak at number 33, Young's lowest peak position for a single at the time. "Let It Go" was the third single lifted from the album, released on 2 March 2009 only in the UK, and failed to impact the UK Top 40, peaking at number 58, surpassing "Grace" as his lowest-charting single ever. The fourth and final single released was "Tell Me The Worst", and it served as a club promotional single.

Critical reception

'Let It Go was received extremely well by Observer Music Monthly; garnering four stars, wherein comparisons were drawn between Let It Go and George Michael's album Older. Allmusic editor Matthew Chisling found that "on his fourth release in the mainstream market, Will Young once again sticks to what he does best: produce material satisfying to the adult contemporary listener. Once again, he has done so while balancing soft-spoken ballads with effervescent fresh dance tunes pleasing to a general audience. As Young matures with every disc he releases, so does his music, as seen on Let It Go [...] Young's unique tone is there, but the true hits are hidden and the support is so irritatingly boring that Let It Go fails to sparkle like Young's prior albums have."

Track listing
 

 signifies a vocal producer

Charts

Weekly charts

Year-end charts

Certifications

References

2008 albums
Will Young albums
19 Recordings albums
Albums produced by Richard Stannard (songwriter)
Albums produced by Ash Howes